= Doroukome =

Town of ancient Lydia

Coordinates: 38°35′12″N 28°34′37″E

Doroukome was a town of ancient Lydia, inhabited during Roman times.

Its site is tentatively located near Ayvatlar in Asiatic Turkey.
